Rev. Michael C. McFarland, S.J. (born 1948) was the 31st president of the College of the Holy Cross in Worcester, Massachusetts. He succeeded Acting President Frank Vellaccio on July 1, 2000, and was succeeded by Rev. Philip Boroughs, S.J.

Biography

Childhood
McFarland was born in Boston in 1948. He was raised in Waltham, Massachusetts and for a short time in California.

Education
McFarland received his bachelor's degree in physics from Cornell University in 1969. He gained his Master's degree in 1979 and his doctorate in 1981, both in computer engineering, from Carnegie Mellon University. McFarland joined the Jesuit order in 1975 and studied at the Weston School of Theology and earned a Master's in divinity and Th. M. in social ethics. He was ordained at the College of the Holy Cross in 1984.

Career
McFarland previously worked for AT&T Bell Labs conducting research in computer-aided design of digital systems. Before going to Holy Cross, he was a computer science professor and the Dean of the College of Arts and Sciences at Gonzaga University.

President of the College of the Holy Cross
McFarland succeeded Acting Holy Cross President Frank Vellaccio on July 1, 2000.

In February 2011, he announced his intention to step down from office. McFarland was succeeded in office by Rev. Philip Boroughs, S.J., who was unanimously elected as the 32nd President of Holy Cross by the board of trustees on May 6, 2011.

McFarland left office on January 9, 2012.

IEEE
McFarland has articles published in the Proceedings of the IEEE (the Institute of Electrical and Electronics Engineers), the IEEE Transactions on Computers, the IEEE Transactions on Computer-Aided Design of Integrated Circuits and Systems, Formal Methods for System Design, the Journal of Systems and Software, Computer, and Technology and Society. For three years he was an associate editor for the IEEE Transactions on Computer-Aided Design of Integrated Circuits and Systems and has participated in numerous program committees for conferences.

Board Memberships
In addition to his responsibilities as Holy Cross' president, McFarland serves on the following:
 The Board of Trustees of The Association of Jesuit Colleges and Universities
 The Board of Trustees of The University of Scranton in Scranton, Pennsylvania
 The Board of Trustees of Boston College High School
 The Board of Trustees of St. John's High School in Shrewsbury, Massachusetts
 The Board of Trustees of Worcester Catholic Charities
 The Board of Trustees of The Worcester Municipal Research Bureau
 The Board of Directors of the NCAA Division I
 The Advisory Council for PricewaterhouseCoopers
 Chairman of the Nativity School of Worcester, Massachusetts

References

External links

20th-century American Jesuits
21st-century American Jesuits
1948 births
Living people
Presidents of the College of the Holy Cross
People from Boston
Carnegie Mellon University alumni
Gonzaga University faculty
Cornell University alumni
Catholics from Massachusetts